The Third Ward Railway, an electric street trolley line in Syracuse, New York, was established in 1886 and ran a distance of  commencing in Park Avenue and terminating at Solvay Process Company in Solvay, a suburb. A second extension was open for business on July 4, 1889, when a branch was added from West Genesee Street to the shore of Onondaga Lake, known as "lake shore."

The company merged with Syracuse Consolidated Street Railway in 1890, after an agreement was made that allowed the new company to lease the lines.

References

Defunct railroads in Syracuse, New York
Defunct New York (state) railroads
Railway companies established in 1886
Railway companies disestablished in 1890